Who's Afraid? is a studio album by Daevid Allen and Kramer, released in 1992 by Shimmy Disc.

Track listing

Personnel 
Adapted from Who's Afraid? liner notes.

Musicians
Daevid Allen – vocals, guitar, acoustic guitar
Kramer – vocals, guitar, bass guitar, keyboards, flute, production, engineering
David Licht – drums, percussion

Production and additional personnel
Michael Macioce – photography
Mark Weinberg – art direction, design

Release history

References

External links 
 

1992 albums
Collaborative albums
Albums produced by Kramer (musician)
Daevid Allen albums
Kramer (musician) albums
Shimmy Disc albums